The K7173/7174 Harbin-Jixi Through Train is Chinese railway running between Harbin to Jixi express passenger trains by the Harbin Railway Bureau, Harbin passenger segment responsible for passenger transport task, Habin originating on the Jixi train. 25B Type Passenger trains running along the Binsui Railway, Tujia Railway and Lindong Railway across Heilongjiang provinces, the entire 554 km. Harbin East Railway Station to Jixi Railway Station running 9 hours and 49 minutes, use trips for K7173; Jixi Railway Station to Harbin East Railway Station to run 8 hours and 59 minutes, use trips for K7174.

References

External links 
鸡西新增至哈快速列车

Passenger rail transport in China
Rail transport in Heilongjiang